"On Deck" is a song by Abra Cadabra. It was released as a single in 2020 and peaked at number 32 on the UK Singles Chart.

Charts

Nominations

References

2020 songs